The Golok or Ngolok peoples live in Golog Tibetan Autonomous Prefecture, Qinghai, China around the upper reaches of the Yellow River and the sacred mountain Amne Machin. The Golok were renowned in both Tibet and China as ferocious fighters free from Tibetan and Chinese control.

The Golok are not an homogeneous group but are composed of peoples of very different geographic origins across the Khams and Amdo region. The Golok was a haven for refugees and immigrants from all over the Amdo and Kham and they are an amalgamation of peoples of diverse origin.

History

The Golok were renowned in both Tibet and China as ferocious fighters free from Tibetan and Chinese control. The name Golok is sometimes interpreted as meaning "rebellious". A Chinese government document translated Golok as "turned head". Neither Tibet or China was able to subdue them for long. Legends say they were ruled by a Queen, a reincarnated goddess whose power was handed down from mother to daughter.

The Golog sought to remain ungoverned by any polity, not Tibet, not Qing China. A Golog herder was heard saying in 1908, “We Golog have...from time immemorial obeyed none but our own laws,” A folk song recorded in 1951 asserted, “Against the orders of the Dharma King of Tibet I rebel! Against China I rebel! We make our own laws!”

Encounter with Tibet
In 1828 when the great mystic and poet of early 19th century Amdo, Shabkar Tsokdruk Rangdrol, was returning to Amdo from Central Tibet, his caravan, carrying letters of passage from both the Dalai and Panchen Lamas, was brutally attacked and pillaged by Golok tribesmen. Some months later Shabkar told the Qinghai amban, who was the senior Qing administrator in Xining, what had happened. The amban, admitting that the Golok tribes were beyond Imperial control asked Shabkar to try preaching to them in hopes that this might tame them to some extent.

Encounter with China

The Chinese had never been able to control the Goloks before, some areas of which owed allegiance to Labrang, but many others which were completely independent. Occasional ambushes killed soldiers of the Ninghai Army, causing loss of dispatches and livestock like yaks. The Hui army, with its modern weaponry, retaliated in draconian fashion and exterminated a group of Goloks, and then convoked the Golok tribes for negotiations, only to slaughter them. A Christian missionary, in writing of the Muslim army's extermination of  the Goloks as an act of God, wrote of the events of 1921 in the following way:

After Tibetans attacked the Ninghai Muslim army in 1922 and 1923, the Ninghai army returned in 1924 and crushed the Tibetans, killing numerous Tibetans.

Distribution

Their territory is referred in Tibetan as smar kog. The exact boundaries of the historical territory of Golok do not correspond to the boundaries of the modern prefecture. Historically the region knows as Golog included parts of northern Sichuan, Maqu County in Ganlho Prefecture in Gansu, and other places in the traditional Tibetan regions of Amdo and Khams.

Footnotes

References
Baldizzoni, Tiziana and Gianni (1994). Tibet: Journey to the Forbidden City.  White Star S.r.l., Vercelli, Italy. American edition (1996) by Stewart, Tabori & Chang, New York N.Y. .
Kornman, Robin. (2005) "The Influence of the Epic of King Gesar on Chogyam Trungpa," in Recalling Chogyam Trungpa, edit. Fabrice Midal. Shambhala Publications. Boston. .
Stein, R. A. (1961): Les tribus anciennes des marches sino-tibétaines. Paris. Presses Universitaires de France.

Further reading

External links

Photos of Golok people.  
 Thupten Chokor Ling Monastery - The Great Stupa for World Peace. 

Tibetan people